Cüneyt Çakır (born 23 November 1976) is a former Turkish football referee. He is best known for refereeing the 2015 UEFA Champions League Final between Juventus and Barcelona. He was FIFA listed since 2006 and a member of the UEFA Elite since 2010 until his retirement.

Honors and awards
His refereeing style has been highly regarded as accurate and controversial at the same time. Recently, he has been identified as the second best referee in the world by the International Federation of Football History and Statistics based on statistics from 2010-2020.

Refereeing career
Çakır has refereed more than 250 matches including 12 Super Lig derbies, 5 of those being The Intercontinental Derby; between Fenerbahçe vs Galatasaray, and was selected for the UEFA European Under-21 Championship finals in Sweden in 2009, taking charge of three games including England's penalty shoot-out win against the hosts in the semi-finals.

He made his UEFA debut as the fourth official in the UEFA Champions League first qualifying round game between Skonto FC and Sliema Wanderers in July 2003. He took charge of two matches at the 2007 UEFA European Under-19 Championship in Austria and was also the referee for two UEFA Euro 2008 qualifying fixtures.

He made his international refereeing debut in the 2008–09 UEFA Cup, taking charge of two games including the group stage fixture between FC Twente and Schalke 04 in December 2008. He oversaw Fulham's second-leg win against Hamburger SV in the 2009–10 UEFA Europa League semi-finals, one of seven matches he refereed in total in the competition that season.

On 29 September 2010, Çakır made his debut in the Champions League Group Stage when he took charge of group D fixture between Rubin Kazan and Barcelona, ending in a one all draw. He also took charge of the match between Chelsea F.C. and Spartak Moscow on 3 November 2010.

He has also refereed the UEFA Europa League Round of 32 match Manchester City-Dynamo Kyiv on 17 March 2011, which ended in a 1–0 win for Manchester City, but Dynamo Kyiv advanced to the next round after winning 2–1 on aggregate. In that game, Çakır sent off Mario Balotelli and dished out eight yellow cards. In August 2011, he officiated five games including semi-final between Portugal and France 2011 FIFA U-20 World Cup, hosted in Colombia.

On 24 April 2012, he officiated the Champions League semi final between FC Barcelona and Chelsea at Camp Nou, Barcelona. Çakır sent off John Terry in first half. Chelsea won 3–2 on aggregate. On 11 June 2012, he officiated the Euro 2012 Match between Ukraine and Sweden.

On 18 June, he also officiated the Euro 2012 match between Italy and Ireland where he was very precise when it came to ensuring the correct distance from the ball to the defenders' wall, though he also angered the Irish by sending off Keith Andrews one minute before the end of the game. He was not selected to referee a quarter-final game but he was fourth official in the England v Italy quarter-final. On 27 June 2012, he officiated the semi-final match between Portugal and Spain. Çakır showed 9 yellow cards in this match in 120 minutes.

On 1 July 2012, he was appointed as fourth official in the Euro 2012 final, between Spain and Italy, which was played in Kyiv. On 14 December 2012, he was appointed to referee the 2012 FIFA Club World Cup Final, between Corinthians and Chelsea, which was played in Yokohama. Corinthians won 1–0. Çakır sent off Gary Cahill in this game.

On 5 March 2013, Çakır officiated the UEFA Champions League match between Manchester United and Real Madrid, and, in a controversial decision, sent off Manchester United player Nani during the second half of the match, a decision that enraged Alex Ferguson in what became his last Champions League game as United manager. On 9 July 2014, he was appointed to referee the 2014 FIFA World Cup semi-final match, between Netherlands and Argentina, which was played in São Paulo.

Çakır officiated the 2015 UEFA Champions League Final match between Juventus and Barcelona at Olympiastadion in Berlin, Germany on 6 June 2015 and showed his yellow card three times. In 2016, Çakır officiated two different semi-final matches in the 2015–16 UEFA Champions League, the first referee to do so. Çakır officiated the 2016–17 UEFA Champions League semi-final match between Atlético Madrid and Real Madrid at Vicente Calderón in Madrid, Spain on 10 May 2017.

In the 2017–18 UEFA Champions League, Çakır officiated the group stage match between Bayern Munich and Paris Saint-Germain in December 2017, as well as the round of 16 game between FC Barcelona and Chelsea at the Stamford Bridge on 20 February 2018. Later, he refereed the semifinal second leg match between Real Madrid and Bayern Munich in Madrid.

Çakır officiated the first round of the 2018–19 UEFA Champions League between Liverpool and Paris Saint-Germain. and the famous Liverpool F.C semi final comeback vs FC Barcelona in the 2018/19 season of the Champions League

On 5 August 2022, via the official website of the Turkish Football Association his retirement is announced; from now on, his role will consist in training young referees.

FIFA World Cup

References

External links

 
 
 
 

1976 births
Living people
Sportspeople from İzmir
Turkish football referees
UEFA Champions League referees
UEFA Europa League referees
2014 FIFA World Cup referees
Insurance agents
UEFA Euro 2012 referees
UEFA Euro 2016 referees
2018 FIFA World Cup referees
Football referees at the 2016 Summer Olympics
UEFA Euro 2020 referees